The Del Norte Triplicate is an American paid newspaper which serves the city of Crescent City and surrounding Del Norte county. It is published weekly on Fridays.

History 
The Del Norte Daily Triplicate traces its roots back to 1879, starting as the Del Norte Record. The Record was established by J. E. Eldredge, edited by George Leon, and was the official paper of Del Norte County.

The name Del Norte Daily Triplicate comes from the names of three papers that united in 1912—the Coast Times, Del Norte Record, and Crescent City News. The term comes not from the term used for carbon copies, but from the original Latin triplicare, meaning "a third thing corresponding to others of the same kind."

In 1913, W.H. McMaster left the Palladium and became editor and manager of the Del Norte Triplicate.

John A. Juza purchased the Triplicate in December 1922, updating the press to a linotype machine. Prior to joining the Triplicate, Juza had been publisher of The Reporter in Oregon. John Juza and his wife Ella Mae ran the paper for 30 years until their retirement.

In 1956, the paper broke with longstanding tradition of withholding names of arrested minors from print, making its policy to print them even for minor infractions.

In 1964, the Triplicate was completely destroyed in the wake of a tidal wave caused by a major Alaskan earthquake. Bill Soberanes of the Petaluma Argus-Courier reported that "The building in which this newspaper had been published (up until the tidal wave) was hit by the full blast of the tidal wave. Every copy of the newspaper printed the day before was washed away. The two linotypes were flooded over and rendered useless by the onrushing ocean waves." The tidal wave, which did significant damage to Crescent City with a 21-foot wave traveling 500 miles per hour, killed 11 people in the city. The Triplicate's editor, James J. Yarbrough recalled, "There was eight feet of water in my office. I watched from up the street and saw the sparks fly when the water hit the Linotype machine. I saw a 900-pound roll of newsprint bobbing around like a spool." After the destruction, the Triplicate moved its printing headquarters to Humboldt County.

The move to Humboldt County called into question the paper's designation as a paper of record for Del Norte County. In 1965, Attorney General Thomas C. Lynch ruled that the paper could still be considered a general circulation paper for Del Norte County, despite its removed printing location.

In 2019, Country Media, Inc. acquired the Triplicate from Western Communications.

Awards 
In 2017, the Del Norte Triplicate won 2nd place in the Breaking News category in its division of the California's Better Newspapers Contest.

References

Weekly newspapers published in California
Crescent City, California
Del Norte County, California